Mastixia eugenioides is a tree in the family Nyssaceae. The specific epithet  is from the Latin and refers to the resemblance of the leaves to those of the genus Eugenia.

Description
The smooth bark is greyish to yellowish brown.

Distribution and habitat
Mastixia eugenioides is endemic to Borneo. Its habitat is mixed dipterocarp forests from sea-level to  altitude.

References

eugenioides
Endemic flora of Borneo
Trees of Borneo
Plants described in 1976